The 1907 Qaratog earthquake occurred at 04:23 UTC on 21 October near Qaratog (Karatag) in the border area between Uzbekistan and Tajikistan, then part of the Russian Empire. The shock had an estimated surface wave magnitude of 7.4 and a maximum felt intensity of IX (Violent) on the Mercalli intensity scale. Estimates of the death toll range between 12,000 and 15,000.

See also
 List of earthquakes in 1907
 List of earthquakes in Tajikistan

References

External links

Qaratog Earthquake, 1907
Earthquakes in Tajikistan
Earthquakes in Uzbekistan
1907 in Asia
1907 in the Russian Empire
Earthquakes in Russia
October 1907 events
1907 disasters in the Russian Empire
Disasters in the Russian Empire